Bulbophyllum sanguineopunctatum is a species of orchid in the genus Bulbophyllum in section Cirrhopetalum.

References 

The Bulbophyllum-Checklist
The Internet Orchid Species Photo Encyclopedia

sanguineopunctatum
Endemic flora of Laos
Orchids of Laos